Pilyang Kerubin (International title: My Silly Angel / ) is a 2010 Philippine television drama comedy fantasy series broadcast by GMA Network. Directed by Maryo J. de los Reyes and Andoy Ranay, it stars Barbie Forteza in the title role. It premiered on June 7, 2010 on the network's Telebabad line up replacing Panday Kids. The series concluded on August 27, 2010 with a total of 60 episodes.

The series is streaming online on YouTube.

Cast and characters

Lead cast
 Barbie Forteza as Charity Santos

Supporting cast
 Joshua Dionisio as Michael Alvarez
 Elmo Magalona as Aaron Alejandrino
 Raymart Santiago as Arman Santos
 Angelika dela Cruz as Melissa Alejandrino-Santos 
 Paolo Contis as Jonas Alejandrino
 Lotlot de Leon as Maring Ignacio
 Ina Feleo as Lailani Santos
 Joel Torre as Dante Garcia
 Sunshine Garcia as Adrianna Peralta
 Shamaine Centenera-Buencamino as Ason Garcia
 Jewel Mische as Rosalie Dela Cruz
 Maureen Larrazabal as Azura
 John Lapus as Aroo
 Janno Gibbs as San Pedro
 Eddie Garcia as Potpot

Guest cast
 Maricel Soriano as Regina
 Mark Bautista as Gabriel
 Marvin Agustin as Adante
 Camille Prats as Rosa
 Jennica Garcia as Betty
 Iza Calzado as Sandra
 TJ Trinidad as Albert
 Carl Guevarra as Carding
 Wynwyn Marquez as Lily
 Yasmien Kurdi as Hannah
 Jan Marini Alano as Marissa
 Iwa Moto as Eva
 Julio Diaz as Gaston
 Jiro Manio as Rodjun
 Daria Ramirez as Virginia
 Jim Paredes as Ronaldo Esteban
 Pinky Marquez as Theresa
 Antonio Aquitania as Eugene

Ratings
According to AGB Nielsen Philippines' Mega Manila People/Individual television ratings, the pilot episode of Pilyang Kerubin earned a 14% rating. While the final episode scored a 14.9% rating.

References

External links
 

2010 Philippine television series debuts
2010 Philippine television series endings
Angels in television
Fantaserye and telefantasya
Filipino-language television shows
GMA Network drama series
Philippine teen drama television series
Television shows set in the Philippines